The 2011 Kuwaiti Crown Prince Cup was a cup competition involving teams from the Kuwaiti Premier League and the Kuwaiti Division One league. It was again moved to the end of the domestic league campaign after being held in mid season last year.

The 2011 edition was the 18th edition to be held.

First round

12 teams play a knockout tie. 6 clubs advance to the next round.

Quarter-finals

8 teams play a knockout tie. 4 clubs advance to the next round.

Semi-finals

4 teams play a knockout tie. Winners advance to the final

Final

Kuwait Crown Prince Cup
2010–11 domestic association football cups
2010–11 in Kuwaiti football